Massen-Niederlausitz is a municipality in the Elbe-Elster district, in Lower Lusatia, Brandenburg, Germany.

History
From 1815 to 1947, the constituent localities of Massen-Niederlausitz (Babben, Betten, Lindthal, Massen, Gröbitz and Ponnsdorf) were part of the Prussian Province of Brandenburg. From 1952 to 1990, they were part of the Bezirk Cottbus of East Germany. On 31 December 1997, the municipality of Massen-Niederlausitz was formed by merging the municipalities of Babben, Betten, Lindthal and Massen. On 31 December 2001, the municipalities of Gröbitz and Ponnsdorf were merged into it.

Demography

References

Localities in Elbe-Elster